Baron is an unincorporated community in Adair County, Oklahoma, United States, located along U.S. Route 59 between Westville and Stilwell. It was built on the West Branch of the Baron Fork of the Illinois River, a tributary of the Arkansas River via the Illinois River.

Baron is located at  (35.9000843, -94.60022160)

References

Unincorporated communities in Adair County, Oklahoma
Unincorporated communities in Oklahoma